WENR refers to the following broadcasting stations in the United States:

WENR (AM), a radio station on 1090 kHz licensed to Englewood, Tennessee, United States
WENR (defunct), an AM radio station on 870 then 890 kHz licensed to Chicago, Illinois, United States, and merged into WLS (AM) in 1959
WLS-FM, a radio station on 94.7 MHz licensed to Chicago, Illinois, United States, which held the call sign WENR-FM until 1965
WLS-TV, a television station (channel 7 analog/44 digital) licensed to Chicago, Illinois, United States, which held the call sign WENR-TV from 1948 to 1953